Herminio Jose Lualhati "Ogie" Alcasid Jr. (born August 27, 1967) is a Filipino actor, singer-songwriter, parodist, and comedian. He is currently the President of OPM (Organisasyon ng Pilipinong Mang-Aawit).

Early career
Ogie is a former batch member of the all-male singing group Kundirana batch 1984 after Gary Valenciano. His first album was released in 1989. His debut movie was Feel Na Feel released by Regal Entertainment in 1990. In 1991, Ogie made his VIVA films debut movie, Pitong Gamol.

Television career

Alcasid's television career started as one of the hosts of comedy show Small Brothers on ABS-CBN in 1992. He appeared on other comedy programs such as ABS-CBN's Mana Mana (1991–92), ABC's Tropang Trumpo (from 1994 to 1995), GMA Network's Bubble Gang (1995-2013), QTV's Ay, Robot! (2005–07), and a sitcom Show Me Da Manny (2010–11).

He also branched out as a game show host, beginning in ABS-CBN's Game Na Game Na! in 1995, IBC 13's Fastbreak, a former basketball game show in 1999, the Philippine version of Family Feud on ABC-5 in 2001 and Celebrity Duets: Philippine Edition on GMA. He was a host on SOP Rules. He got his big break in Hanggang Kailan, his first drama show, and also sang its main theme with Aiza Seguerra. In 1995, he moved to GMA Network, leaving ABS-CBN.

Alcasid became a judge for Pinoy Idol. and hosted such game shows as Da Big Show and Hole in the Wall. In 2013, he left GMA Network and moved to TV5, where his first project under the channel was The Mega and the Songwriter.

In 2016, he returned to his original home network, ABS-CBN. He joined Tawag Ng Tanghalan on It's Showtime as a judge and he was also a judge of Your Face Sounds Familiar: Kids, replacing Jed Madela, the judge of season 1 and 2 of the same show.

Before he returned to ABS-CBN, his contract on TV5 had expired. He later appeared on several GMA Network shows as a guest. He appeared as a guest on Yan Ang Morning!, Sunday PinaSaya, and Eat Bulaga! as a guest judge. He was a special guest in Sarap Diva, hosted by his wife, Regine Velasquez-Alcasid, and the comedy show Bubble Gang, where he recently a cast member until 2013 before his transfer to TV5.

Recording career

Alcasid debuted as a singer in 1989 with the release of his self-titled album. Ogie Alcasid reached gold record status, while his debut single "Nandito Ako" ("I Am Here") was awarded "Song of the Year" by local radio station Magic 89.9. He has since released 18 albums, including a Christmas album (Larawan ng Pasko/"Images of Christmas", 1994), a live album (OA sa Hits (Live), 2002), and four greatest hits albums. He has received a total of twelve gold records, three platinum records, and three double platinum records.

Discography

Albums

Soundtracks
Boy Pick-Up: The Movie (Universal Records, 2012)
I Do Bidoo Bidoo (available only on iTunes, released in 2012)
Hoy, Love You! (with Regine Velasquez-Alcasid for Hoy, Love You!, released in 2021)

Singles
"Peksman" (debut single, 1988)
"Nandito Ako"
"Sa Kanya" (also covered by Zsa Zsa Padilla from Viva's first gospel album, Servant of All Vol. 1 in 2000)
Pangako" (also covered by his wife Regine Velasquez, and by Martin Nievera, a duet with Manilyn Reynes)
"Ako Iyong Iyo"
"Ikaw Sana" 
"Pagkakataon"
"Kung Mawawala Ka" (feat. Karylle)
"Hanggang Ngayon" (feat. Regine Velasquez)
"Bakit Ngayon Ka Lang" (also covered by Freestyle)
"Huwag Ka Nang Mawawala" (also covered by Gary V.)
"Dito sa Puso Ko" (also covered by Josh Santana feat. Nikki Gil)
"Kape Ka Ba?" (Alcasid's first hip-hop song feat. Michael V. from his 2013 original comedy soundtrack album, Boy Pick-Up: The Movie)
"Nakakaloka"
"Tabakonabes?"
"Tong Kanta Tong Kay Tsong Kay Tsang" (inspired by a former comedy segment of Bubble Gang)
"Beautiful" (feat. Moira Dela Torre)
"Thank You, Pa"
"Pasko ng mga Pinoy"
"ILY" (with Regine Velasquez and DJ M.O.D)
"Maga Ako Manas Ako" (credited as Eydie Waw feat. The Wawettes)

Covers
"Dito Ba?" (original by Kuh Ledesma)
"Kung Tayo Magkakalayo" (original by Rey Valera; also covered by Gary V.)
"Salawahan" (feat. Urbanflow; original by The Boyfriends)
"Sir Duke" (original by Stevie Wonder from VIVA's OPM jazz compilation album, The Best of Crossover Presents in 2003)
"Yakap" (original by Junior)
"Ikaw Lamang" (original by Gary V.)
"Bato Sa Buhangin" (original by Cinderella Band; also covered by Juan Pablo Dream)

Awards

Awit Awards Best Produced Record of the Year (BAKIT KA LUMAYO)
Awit Awards Best Inspirational/Religious Recording (SIYA ANG BIDA)
2001 Gawad Pagkilala kay Ogie Alcasid (mang-aawit/kompositor/liriko) sa Pamamagitan ng Musika sa Wikang Pilipino mula sa Republika ng Pilipinas Sanggunian ng Wika sa Pambansang Pagpapa-unlad s/Pamamahala ng Komisyon sa Wikang Pilipino

2008 FAMAS Golden Artist Awardee
2008 Gold Record Award for The Greatest Filipino Songbook, August 31, 2008
2009 Platinum Award for The Greatest Filipino Songbook, April 26, 2009
2008 Aliw Awards "Entertainer of the Year"
(2000, 2004, 2006, 2007, 2008 & 2010) Winner, PMPC Star Awards for TV Best Comedy Actor
2009 STAR AWARDS FOR MUSIC( Male Recording Artist-First Recipient)
2010 Aliw Awards "Best Major Concert by a male performer in the Concert Ogie and the Idols"
2010 PMPC Star Awards for "BEST COMEDY ACTOR(BUBBLE GANG)"
2011 PMPC Star Awards for "BEST COMEDY ACTOR(BUBBLE GANG)"
2011 GMMSF Box-Office Entertainment Awards - Male Concert Performer of the Year
2012 Empress Award for Best Comedy Actor
2012 Multiple Intelligence for music award (Multiple Intelligence school)
2014 KBP Golden Award Winner For Best Comedy Actor
Myx Music Awards 2016 Magna Awardee
2018 49th Box Office Entertainment Awards Male Concert Performer Of The Year #paMORE
2018 PMPC Star Awards For Best Comedy Actor (Home Sweetie Home | ABS-CBN)
2018 CMMA Best Inspirational Song (Di Ka Pababayaan)
2019 50th Box Office Entertainment Awards Male Concert Performer of the Year

Business career
Owner of chain of hot dog stalls called Oggie Doggie.
He co-owns Ryu Ramen and Curry Restaurant
He co-owns Hungry Samurai, a Japanese fast food restaurant
He is Chairman of opm2go.com, an online music store
Founder of ATEAM (Alcasid Total Events & Artist Management, Inc.) 2014–present www.ateam.com.ph

Non-showbiz activities
President of Organisasyon ng Pilipinong Mang-Aawit, an organization of singers (2010 – present)
Commissioner of the EDSA People Power Commission (2011 – 2016)
Sagip Foundation Spokesperson
Kapuso Foundation, Ogie and Regine Ukay-Ukay
National Commission for Culture and Arts, Heritage/ASEAN Ambassador
Childhope Asia Spokesperson

Personal life
In 1995, Alcasid married Australian beauty queen Michelle van Eimeren, who represented Australia in the 1994 Miss Universe pageant held in the Philippines. The couple had two children, Leila and Sarah. In 2007, Alcasid announced that he and Eimeren had separated. He is also cousins with Ai-Ai delas Alas through his mother.

On December 22, 2010, he married Regine Velasquez, at a resort in Nasugbu, Batangas. He and Velasquez have a son, Nathaniel James ("Nate"), born on November 8, 2011.

Alcasid is a Christian and an attendee of Victory Christian Fellowship.

Footnotes

External links
Official website
GMA Network profile (archived)

1967 births
Living people
Filipino male comedians
21st-century Filipino businesspeople
20th-century Filipino male singers
Filipino male television actors
Filipino singer-songwriters
Filipino Christians
Filipino evangelicals
Filipino parodists
Male actors from Manila
Singers from Manila
Tagalog people
ABS-CBN personalities
TV5 (Philippine TV network) personalities
GMA Network personalities
PolyEast Records artists
MCA Music Inc. (Philippines) artists
GMA Music artists
Universal Records (Philippines) artists
Star Music artists
21st-century Filipino male singers
Viva Artists Agency
Filipino male film actors
Filipino television personalities
Filipino television presenters
Filipino television variety show hosts
Filipino game show hosts